The 1981–82 Hamburger SV season was the 35th season in the club's history and the 19th consecutive season playing in the Bundesliga.

Season summary
In 1981, Austrian coach Ernst Happel was appointed as former manager Branko Zebec's permanent replacement. Under Happel in the 1981–82 season, HSV managed to regain the Bundesliga title and reach the  final of the UEFA Cup, where they lost 4–0 on aggregate to Sweden's IFK Göteborg.

Starting with a win against Borussia Dortmund on 30 January 1982, HSV went on a 36 match undefeated run in the Bundesliga which would stretch into the following season. This remained a Bundesliga record until November 2013, when it was broken by Bayern Munich.

Hamburg would also equal the record of suffering no home losses in a 34-match Bundesliga season, a feat they would repeat on their way to winning the league title again in the following season.

Squad

Competitions

Overview

Bundesliga

League table

DFB Pokal

UEFA Cup

First round

Second round

Third round

Quarter-final

Semi-final

Final

References
General reference books

Web references

Hamburger SV seasons
Hamburger
German football championship-winning seasons